I Got a Boy (stylized in all caps) is the fourth Korean studio album (sixth overall) by South Korean girl group Girls' Generation. It was released for digital download on January 1, 2013, by S.M. Entertainment, and was made available for physical sales the following day by KT Music. Musically, the album is characterized as combining elements from a wide range of genres including R&B, new wave, and EDM. This is the last studio album and Korean studio album with their founding member Jessica before her dismissal of the group in 2014 and subsequent departure from SM Entertainment in 2015.

I Got a Boy received mixed reviews from music critics; it was praised for its eclectic musical styles, however several were favorable towards only a few songs on the album. Commercially, it was a success domestically, peaking atop the South Korean Gaon Album Chart and became the second best-selling album of 2013 in the country. The album additionally charted at number seven on the Japanese Oricon Albums Chart, number three on the Taiwanese G-Music chart, and number one on the Billboard World Albums.

To promote the album, Girls' Generation appeared and performed on several music programs including Music Bank and Show! Music Core in early 2013. The album's lead single was "Dancing Queen", a remake of Duffy's 2008 single "Mercy", released on December 21, 2012. The second single, "I Got a Boy", was released on January 1, 2013, and was subjected to major attention from Western media outlets following its winning Video of the Year at the inaugural YouTube Music Awards.

Promotion

Release
After the group's label S.M. Entertainment revealed the group intended to return in January 2013, MBC announced on December 11, 2012, that the group would be receiving a separate broadcast depicting the album process in preparation of the album's release in January 2013. The single track, "Dancing Queen", was released on December 21, 2012. The title track, "I Got a Boy", was released digitally on January 1, 2013. The full album was released on January 2, 2013. Prior to the release in October, member Seohyun said: "This album is really different from our usual ones. It’s like challenging a person's limits. I'm looking forward to what the fans will think, and because it’s still a secret amongst us, I just feel nervous."

Live performances
The first of the group's comeback performances began on January 3, 2013, on Mnet's M! Countdown. Seven members appeared on Mnet's Wide Open Studio program prior to their comeback performance, Yuri and Hyoyeon were not present as they were preparing to emcee M! Countdown. The group continued their first week of performances for the album on KBS' Music Bank, MBC's Music Core and SBS's Inkigayo on January 4, 5 and 6, respectively. Girls' Generation held an hour-long "Virtual Concert" broadcast live via Naver Music on January 5, 2013, where they perform "I Got a Boy", "Talk Talk" and "Dancing Queen". The group also performed five songs from the album on their MBC comeback special; Girls' Generation's Romantic Fantasy on January 1, 2013. The group also performed on KBS Hope Concert. The group performed "I Got a Boy" and "Dancing Queen" in Dream K-Pop Fantasy concert held in Manila, Philippines on January 19, 2013, making it their first overseas performance of both songs. On KBS Yoo Hee-Yeol's Sketchbook, the group performed "I Got a Boy", "Dancing Queen", and  "Lost in Love". They performed their single "I Got a Boy" as part of the setlist on their Second Japan Arena Tour.

The album was officially tour promoted on Girls' Generation World Tour Girls & Peace, began on June 8, 2013, in Olympic Gymnastics Arena, Seoul, South Korea, finished on February 15, 2014, in Cotai Arena, Macau. The tour also promotes their third studio album, The Boys, officially.

Composition

Dsign Music, the group of famous composers that composed the hit song, "Genie", as well as the top composers of Europe including Will Simms and Sarah Lundback, and the composer from Korea, Young-Jin Yoo participated in the making of the album. "I Got a Boy" is an electronic dance song that mixes pop, retro, and urban genres. "Talk Talk" is the Korean version of Boomerang which was included in their second Japanese studio album Girls & Peace, and the Korean lyrics tell a guy who does not understand a girl's heart should try to talk to his girl that it gives the feeling different from Japanese version while it has the same melody and arrangement.

"Baby Maybe", mixes lyrics written by Girls' Generation members Sooyoung, Yuri, and Seohyun that expresses the fluttering heart of a girl in love. "XYZ" with a powerful synthesizer pattern is also written by Yuri and Seohyun. The album also contains "Lost in Love (유리아이)", a duet by Taeyeon and Tiffany expresses the changes of heart that accepts the breakup with a lover as time passes. The track "Promise" is a mid-tempo soul ballad composed and arranged by British songwriter Joseph Belmaati in his debut collaboration with the group. The lyrics were penned by Mo-ul and contain a message for the fans. "Express 999" is retro pop combining 1980s new wave influences, and various genres. "Look at Me" combines organic beats, a playful melody, and easy-to-sing-along chorus. "Romantic St." is a swing jazz style song.

Singles
"Dancing Queen" was released as a pre-release single on December 21, 2012. "Dancing Queen", a remake of Welsh singer Duffy's song "Mercy" was recorded in 2008 as a comeback song after a nine-month hiatus, however plans were scrapped due to copyright issues and the group went with "Gee".

"I Got a Boy" was released digitally on January 1, 2013. The "I Got A Boy" music video and album were released simultaneously at 5 p.m. KST. The video, as well as the teaser in the "Dancing Queen" video, became the center of public scrutiny after several screenshots from the video circulated on the internet with Sunny's hat having the words "WELCOME MOTHERF★CKERS" printed on it.

Reception

I Got a Boy received mixed reviews from music critics. David Jeffries from AllMusic called the album an "explosion," writing:  "Fans will embrace it with open arms, while mega-fans should also clear some shelf space since the physical edition of the album was made available with ten different covers, one for each member of the group and then one with the whole crew." Jeff Benjamin writing for Billboard wrote that the album's musical styles "satisfy not only K-pop fans but also listeners of all types of popular music" with elements of "forward-thinking" genres such as EDM, R&B, and new wave. 

Hwang Seon-eop from South Korean online magazine IZM, however, was less enthusiastic towards the album's "experimental" styles and singled out "Baby Maybe" and "Romantic St." as the two better songs on the album. Several music critics from webzine Weiv were generally unfavorable of the album; critic Choi Min-woo wrote that "in the end, the only thing that stands out is 'I Got A Boy'". Idologys Mimryo likewise complimented the musicality of the title track, although he expressed boredom with the remainder of the record.

A week after the release of "Dancing Queen," the song was number one on the Gaon Single chart. I Got a Boy debuted at the number two spot of Billboard'''s World Album Chart. They also placed 2nd on the Heatseekers Albums Chart and 23rd on the Independent Albums Chart. The album ranked 7th on Oricon Weekly Chart and ranked 22nd on Oricon Monthly Chart. "I Got a Boy" also rank first on Five Music Korean-Japanese Chart in Taiwan for two weeks in a row.

Track listing
Credits adapted from Naver

Notes
 "Dancing Queen" (recorded in 2008) is a remake of the song, "Mercy", by Welsh singer Duffy.
 "Baby Maybe" was originally co-written as a demo in English by English singer-songwriter Pixie Lott under the title as "What You Do." The song was later given to Girls' Generation with Seohyun, Yuri and Sooyoung re-writing the lyrics in Korean.
 "Talk Talk" (previously titled Boomerang) was recorded in 2008. A Japanese version was included in their second Japanese studio album, Girls & Peace (2012).
 "Lost in Love" is a duet song sung by Taeyeon and Tiffany.
 "Express 999" is a reference to the Anime Galaxy Express 999.

Personnel
Credits for I Got a Boy'' adapted are from album liner notes.

 Girls' Generation – vocals
 Taeyeon – main vocal, background vocal
 Jessica – main vocal, background vocal
 Sunny – lead vocal, background vocal
 Tiffany – lead vocal, background vocal
 Hyoyeon – vocal, rapper
 Yuri – vocal, rapper, songwriter, background vocals
 Sooyoung – vocal, rapper, songwriter
 Yoona – vocal, rapper
 Seohyun – lead vocal, background vocal, songwriter
 Yoo Young-jin – producer, songwriter, translator, audio mixing, recording
 Will Simms – songwriting, producer
 Yang Geunyeong – background vocals
 Anne Judith Wik – songwriter
 Sarah Lundback Bell – songwriter
 Kim Jungbae – guitar
 Yoong – strings
 Park Chang-hyun – songwriting, background vocal, producer, piano, keyboard, programming
 Shim Sangwon – string arrangement, conductor
 Choi Wonhyuk – bass guitar
 Moul – songwriter
 Joseph Belmaati – songwriter, producer
 Stephen Andrew Booker – songwriter, producer
 Aimee Ann Duffy – songwriter

 Nam Goongjin – recording, mixing
 Im Kwangwook – arrangement
 Mich Hansen – songwriter, producer
 Jonas Jeberg – songwriter
 Ruth-Anne Cunningham – songwriter
 Jung Eunkyung – recording
 Jung Euisuk – recording, mixing
 Kim Jung-bae – songwriter
 Goo Jongpil – mixing
 Kim Tae-sung – songwriter, translator
 Im Yoonjae – vocal director
 Charlie Mason – songwriter, producer
 Oscar Gorres – songwriter, songwriter
 Danny Saucedo – songwriter
 Choi Yeongkyung – vocal director
 Lee Sungho – recording
 Lee Joohyung – recording
 Kim Jung-bae – songwriting
 Shinmin – string arrangement, conductor
 Hong Junho – guitar
 Lee Sanghoon – drums
 Kenzie – organ, producer, recording, vocal director
 Jun Gandi – songwriter
 Johan Gustafson – songwriter, producer
 Jee Yoon Yoo – songwriter
 Lee Shinsung – songwriter

 Fredrik Häggstam – songwriter, producer
 Sebastian Lundberg – songwriter, producer
 Pixie Lott – songwriter
 Louis Schoorl – songwriter
 Hwang Hyun – vocal director, recording
 Lee Joohyung – vocal director
 Choi Yeongkyung – background vocals
 Jonathan Yip – producer
 Ray Romulus – producer
 Reremy Reeves – producer
 Kim Taesung – arrangement
 Kim Yongshin – arrangement
 Nam Goongjin – mixing
 Kim Jiyeon – background vocal
 Lee Joohyung – recording
 Hyuk Shin – songwriter, producer
 Matthew Heath – songwriter
 Hailey Collier – songwriter
 DK – songwriter
 Jordan Kyle – songwriter, producer
 Lee Yoonji – guitar
 Lee Chanmi – songwriter
 Sumi – songwriter
 Lee Soo Man – executive producer

Charts

Weekly charts

Monthly charts

Year-end charts

Release history

References

External links
 Girls' Generation official website 

2013 albums
Girls' Generation albums
SM Entertainment albums
KMP Holdings albums
Korean-language albums